The Los Tuxtlas Biosphere Reserve or Biósfera Los Tuxtlas, is a biosphere reserve located in the coastal and higher elevations of the Sierra de los Tuxtlas, in Los Tuxtlas of Veracruz state, in south eastern Mexico.

Ecoregion
The area is notable for its diversity of plants and animals. It contains the neotropical Sierra de los Tuxtlas tropical rainforest ecoregion, of the tropical and subtropical moist broadleaf forests biome.

Other Tropical and subtropical moist broadleaf forests in the region include: 
Veracruz moist forests
Petén–Veracruz moist forests

References

External links
 Parkswatch.org - Los Tuxtlas Biosphere Reserve

Los Tuxtlas
Biosphere reserves of Mexico
Protected areas of Veracruz